The 2010–11 Liga Nacional de Hockey Hielo season was the 39th season of the national ice hockey league in Spain. The regular season of the Liga Nacional began on 18 September and ended on 22 January.

Regular-Season Standings

Play-offs 

The playoffs were best-of-three series and started on February 19, ending on March 12 with the final victory of CH Jaca.

External links
2010/11 Liga Nacional season
Federación Española de Deportes de Hielo

Spain
Liga Nacional de Hockey Hielo seasons
Liga